Centrometopia interruptella is a species of snout moth. It was described by Émile Louis Ragonot in 1887 and is known from Turkmenistan.

The wingspan is about 20 mm.

References

Moths described in 1887
Phycitinae